Flatbush Misdemeanors is an American comedy series created by Kevin Iso and Dan Perlman. It is based on Iso and Perlman's 2017 digital series of the same name. In October 2020, it was given a straight-to-series order by Showtime. The series premiered on May 23, 2021. In August 2021, the series was renewed for a second season, which premiered on June 19, 2022. In September 2022, the series was canceled after two seasons.

Premise 
A raw and grounded comedy of city life, follows Dan and Kevin, who play characters struggling to thrive in their new surroundings in the brash environment of Flatbush, Brooklyn. The show explores two longtime friends seeking to climb out of their heads and connect with others.

Cast and characters

Main 

 Kevin Iso as Kevin, a broke painter from the South, struggling to figure out how to make a living. However, he keeps bumping his head. In the first season, he lives on Dan's couch and delivers food for a local roti shop.
 Dan Perlman as Dan Joseph, a fish-out-of-water public school teacher with a fondness for Xanax. Dan handles chronic depression and an unlikely new stepdad with the help of partner-in-crime, Kevin. In the first season, he also works as the equipment manager and one-time coach for his high school basketball team, the Beauford Delaney Pigeons.
 Kristin Dodson as Zayna Bien-Aime, Drew’s niece. She’s strong and independent and one of Dan’s outspoken high school students.
 Kareem Green as Kareem, an uncompromising, confident alpha male. Kareem owns and operates Kareem's Larry's Bike Shop in Flatbush. He serves as Dan’s self-appointed guide to the neighborhood, excitedly claiming his role as Dan’s new stepdad.  
 Hassan Johnson as Drew Hill, a bold and direct man who is extremely protective of his loved ones. Drew's demands come into conflict with the livelihoods of both Kevin and Dan.

Recurring 

 Maria Bamford as Maria, Dan's mom. Weird, upbeat, with mental health issues, Maria was emotionally dependent on Dan when Dan was a kid. When the series begins, Maria is now happier than she's ever been now that she's with new husband, Kareem. Maria's newfound joy with Kareem is confusing to Dan.
 Kerry Coddett as Jasmine
 Sharlene Cruz as Jess
 Napoleon Emill as Blue, Drew's friend and business associate. Blue is always playing video games and hopes to be a professional Untitled Goose Game player.
 Jackie Fabulous as Miss Venestine
 Sticky Fingaz as Anthony, Zayna's father.
 Sam Jay as Georgia, Kevin's older sister. Georgia is a successful music producer, who is the clear favorite to Kevin and Georgia's parents.
 Alyssa Limperis as Sydney
 Zuri Reed as Dami, a high school student and Zayna's best friend in the first season. Dami is the daughter of a Nigerian nurse and a Haitian minister. Dami does not appear in the second season, as it's revealed that her parents sent her to live in Africa for the year.
 Yamaneika Saunders as Dr. Flowers, Dan's therapist. Dr. Flowers has no patience for Dan. She knits during sessions and shouts at Dan when he doesn't follow her advice.
 Lenny Venito as Franklin, Dan's sponsor in Narcotics Anonymous.
 Zoe Winters as Nancy, the administrator of the No Negro Left Behind Art Fellowship. Nancy is in charge of Kevin's art fellowship in the second season. She lacks self-awareness and views herself as an ally to the black community.
 Roy Wood Jr. as Principal Douglass, the Principal at Beauford Delaney High School. Principal Douglass is by-the-book and no-nonsense, but not interested in playing a hands-on role running the school until necessary. He fills his drawers with children's snacks and quarter-waters. Douglass has little energy for Dan's missteps, but has few other staffing options, so he begrudgingly tolerates Dan.

Guest 
  Greer Barnes as Lawyer
 Joyelle Johnson as Nneka
 Cody Kostro as Terry
 Ali Siddiq as Bishop
 Dan Soder as Ben

Episodes

Series overview

Season 1 (2021)

Season 2 (2022)

Production

Development 
On October 12, 2020,  Showtime ordered Flatbush Misdemeanors to series, with a ten episode, straight-to-series order.
On August 24, 2021, Showtime renewed the series for a second season. On September 14, 2022, Showtime canceled the series after two seasons.

Casting 
On March 12, 2021, Kristin Dodson was cast as a series regular in the series. On March 25, 2021, Hassan Johnson joined the series.

Release

Broadcast 
Flatbush Misdemeanors premiered on May 23, 2021, on Showtime. The first episode was made available online for free on YouTube, as well. The first episode of the second season premieres exclusively on Showtime on June 17, while the season debuts on television on June 19.

International 
The series premiered in the United Kingdom on August 12, 2021, on Sky UK.

Reception 
The show has received mostly positive reviews, with Robert Daniels of RogerEbert.com describing it as "a hilarious, unforced two-hander that feels totally fresh." The New York Times called Flatbush Misdemeanors "really funny." Flatbush has also been praised for its authentic portrayal of the neighborhood. Variety commended the "richly drawn world", while TV Guide described the show as "Old Brooklyn through and through, but still speaks for this generation" and "already one of the best shows of 2021". Upon the show's premiere in the UK, The Guardian commended the show as "fresh and thrilling."

References

External links 
Flatbush Misdemanors at Rotten Tomatoes

2020s American comedy television series
Showtime (TV network) original programming
Television shows set in Brooklyn
2021 American television series debuts
2022 American television series endings
English-language television shows
Flatbush, Brooklyn
Television series set in 2021
Television series based on Internet-based works
Television shows directed by Justin Tipping